The Cider House Rules is the soundtrack of the 1999 Academy Award-winning and Golden Globe-nominated film The Cider House Rules starring Tobey Maguire, Charlize Theron, Michael Caine (who won the Academy Award for Best Supporting Actor for his role as Dr. Wilbur Larch in this film) and Delroy Lindo. The original score was composed by Rachel Portman.

The album was nominated for the Academy Award for Best Original Score (lost to the score of Le violon rouge) and the Grammy Award for "Best Score Soundtrack Album" (lost to the score of American Beauty).

Track listing
"Main Titles" – 2:13
"Homer's Lessons" – 3:45
"Young Girl's Burial" – 0:44
"Homer Asks Wally for a Ride" – 1:29
"Homer Leaves Orphanage" – 4:40
"The Ocean" – 1:01
"The Cider House" – 4:15
"Wally Goes off to War" – 1:50
"Lobster Dinner" – :54
"Burying Fuzzy" – 1:38
"Homer & Candy on the Dock" – 2:25
"Rose Rose Is Pregnant" – 1:18
"Abortion" – 1:54
"Picklers Leave" – 1:19
"Dr. Larch Dies" – 1:40
"Homer Returns to the Orphanage" – 3:44
"Good-Night, You Kings of New England" – 1:09
"End Credits" – 4:35

References

1999 soundtrack albums
Sony Classical Records soundtracks
Drama film soundtracks